Richard Kwame Sefe (born 11 October 1972) is a Ghanaian politician and member of the National Democratic Congress. He is the member of parliament for the Anlo Constituency , in the Volta Region of Ghana.

Elections 
In the 2020 Ghanaian general election, he contested the seat as the National Democratic Congress candidate and won with a majority of 32,920 votes. He replaced Clement Kofi Humado who had been the MP from January 2005.

Philanthropy 
In September 2021, Richard presented some teaching and learning materials to basic schools in Anloga in the Volta Region of Ghana.

References 

Living people
National Democratic Congress (Ghana) politicians
Ghanaian MPs 2021–2025
1972 births